Ernesto Noel Aquino Pérez (born October 16, 1975 in  Honduras) is a former Honduran footballer.

Club career
Aquino started his professional career with hometown club Victoria de la Ceiba but moved abroad to join Salvadoran side Atlético Balboa before the Apertura 2000 season. He has not left Salvadoran football since, playing for Once Municipal before moving to Isidro Metapán in 2008.

Honours

Titles

References

External links
El Grafico profile 

1975 births
Living people
People from La Ceiba
Association football central defenders
Honduran footballers
Honduran expatriate footballers
C.D. Victoria players
Atlético Balboa footballers
Once Municipal footballers
A.D. Isidro Metapán footballers
Liga Nacional de Fútbol Profesional de Honduras players
Expatriate footballers in El Salvador